"Mamas" is a song by American contemporary Christian music singer Anne Wilson and American country music singer Hillary Scott. It was released as the ninth track on Wilson's debut studio album, My Jesus, on April 22, 2022. Wilson co-wrote the song with Jeff Pardo and Matthew West.

"Mamas" peaked at number 15 on the US Hot Christian Songs chart. "Mamas" received a GMA Dove Award nomination for Bluegrass/Country/Roots Recorded Song of the Year at the 2022 GMA Dove Awards.

Reception

Critical response
Jonathan Andre of 365 Days of Inspiring Media opined that "Mamas" had the potential to be a "great hit on country radio." CMT described the song as a "faith-centric melody," "tear-jerking track," and a "moving duet." Jesus Freak Hideout's Josh Balogh said Wilson's duet with Hillary Scott was "well done." JubileeCast's Timothy Yap said the song was "well-crafted," calling it "A future Mother's Day favorite, anyone who has had ever had a mother will smile at the many heartfelt lines." Christopher Wegner, reviewing for CNTRY, also described the song as a future Mother's Day classic.

Accolades

Composition

Commercial performance
"Mamas" debuted at number 31 on the US Hot Christian Songs chart dated May 7, 2022. The song went on to peak at number 15 on the Hot Christian Songs chart dated May 21, 2022.

Music videos
On April 22, 2022, Anne Wilson released the official audio video for the song. On May 4, 2022, Anne Wilson released the official music video for "Mamas". The music video was released as a Mother's Day tribute, and features Wilson's mother as well as Scott's three daughters.

The video begins with Wilson singing to her mother while playing her guitar, followed by an appearance of Hillary Scott at a park playing with her daughters, Eisele Kaye, and twins Betsy Mack and Emory JoAnn. Other scenes in the music video depict mother-daughter relationships in daily life, from a woman holding a baby, a mother teaching her daughter driving, and a father and son visiting a grave.

Charts

References

External links
 

2022 singles
2022 songs
Anne Wilson songs
Songs written by Anne Wilson
Songs written by Jeff Pardo
Songs written by Matthew West
Sparrow Records singles